The Rocanville mine is a large potash mine located in southern Canada in Saskatchewan. Rocanville represents one of the largest potash reserves in Canada having estimated reserves of 1.13 billion tonnes of ore grading 22.5% potassium oxide equivalent.

References 

Potash mines in Canada
Mines in Saskatchewan
Underground mines in Canada